Trail Creek is a town in Coolspring and Michigan townships, LaPorte County, Indiana, United States. The population was 2,052 at the 2010 census. It is included in the Michigan City, Indiana-La Porte, Indiana Metropolitan Statistical Area.

History
Trail Creek was founded upon the river Trail Creek, from which it took its name. It was incorporated as a town in 1924.

Geography
Trail Creek is located at  (41.697107, -86.857177).

Demographics

2010 census
As of the census of 2010, there were 2,052 people, 885 households, and 585 families living in the town. The racial makeup of the town was 91.2% White, 5.5% African American, 0.2% Native American, 0.6% Asian, 1.2% from other races, and 1.3% from two or more races. Hispanic or Latino of any race were 3.3% of the population.

There were 885 households, of which 24.3% had children under the age of 18 living with them, 53.7% were married couples living together, 9.0% had a female householder with no husband present, 3.4% had a male householder with no wife present, and 33.9% were non-families. 29.0% of all households were made up of individuals, and 14.3% had someone living alone who was 65 years of age or older. The average household size was 2.32 and the average family size was 2.85.

The median age in the town was 46.5 years. 19.4% of residents were under the age of 18; 7.4% were between the ages of 18 and 24; 21.3% were from 25 to 44; 30.9% were from 45 to 64; and 21.2% were 65 years of age or older. The gender makeup of the town was 50.4% male and 49.6% female.

2000 census
As of the census of 2000, there were 2,296 people, 932 households, and 699 families living in the town. The racial makeup of the town was 95.12% White, 2.70% African American, 0.48% Asian, 0.22% from other races, and 1.48% from two or more races. Hispanic or Latino of any race were 1.22% of the population.

There were 932 households, out of which 28.2% had children under the age of 18 living with them, 64.6% were married couples living together, 6.8% had a female householder with no husband present, and 25.0% were non-families. 22.1% of all households were made up of individuals, and 12.3% had someone living alone who was 65 years of age or older. The average household size was 2.46 and the average family size was 2.87.

In the town, the population was spread out, with 21.7% under the age of 18, 5.0% from 18 to 24, 25.2% from 25 to 44, 27.3% from 45 to 64, and 20.8% who were 65 years of age or older. The median age was 44 years. For every 100 females, there were 97.8 males. For every 100 females age 18 and over, there were 91.6 males.

The median income for a household in the town was $43,750, and the median income for a family was $51,098. Males had a median income of $41,250 versus $26,031 for females. The per capita income for the town was $20,289. About 3.0% of families and 5.3% of the population were below the poverty line, including 7.3% of those under age 18 and 11.1% of those age 65 or over.

Features

Trail Creek is home to Nelson Park, which has two baseball fields, a basketball court, a swingset and jungle gym. The name derives from Trail Creek, a creek which empties into Lake Michigan, forming the harbor for Michigan City, Indiana. This creek served as a trail to the interior of LaPorte County.

Education
Trail Creek residents are served by the Michigan City Public Library. Trail Creek residents may also request a free library card from any La Porte County Public Library branch.

References

External links
 Town of Trail Creek, Indiana website

Towns in LaPorte County, Indiana
Towns in Indiana